Hot Rize is a debut album by the progressive bluegrass band Hot Rize.

Track listing

 Blue Night (David Kirk McGee) 2:23
 Empty Pocket Blues (Clive Parker) 2:20
 Nellie Kane (Tim O'Brien) 2:58
 High On A Mountain 3:06
 Ain't I Been Good To You 2:21
 Powwow The Indian Boy (Peter Wernick) 3:06
 Prayer Bells Of Heaven (traditional) 2:57
 This Here Bottle (O'Brien, Wernick) 2:40
 Ninety Nine Years (And One Dark Day) (O'Brien, Wernick) 3:08
 Old Dan Tucker (att. Dan Emmett) 1:20
 Country Boy Rock 'n' Roll 2:06
 Standing In The Need Of Prayer (Rusty Goodman) 2:40
 Durham's Reel 3:07
 Midnight On The Highway (Pete Sully) 2:44

Personnel
 Nick Forster - bass, vocals
 Tim O'Brien - vocals, mandolin, violin
 Pete Wernick - banjo, vocals
 Charles Sawtelle - guitar, vocals

References

External links
Official site

1979 debut albums
Hot Rize albums